Zone 70 is a zone of the municipality of Al Daayen in the state of Qatar. The main districts recorded in the 2015 population census were Leabaib, Al Ebb, Jeryan Jenaihat, Al Kheesa, Rawdat Al Hamama, Wadi Al Wasaah, Al Sakhama, Al Masrouhiya, Wadi Lusail, Lusail, Umm Qarn, and Al Daayen. 

Other districts which fall within its administrative boundaries are Al Rehayya, Qaryat Al Lusail Al Shamaliya, and Tenbek.

Demographics

Land use
The Ministry of Municipality and Environment (MME) breaks down land use in the zone as follows.

References 

Zones of Qatar
Al Daayen